Chapel of the Chimes may refer to:

Chapel of the Chimes (Oakland, California)
Chapel of the Chimes (Hayward, California)
Chapel of the Chimes (EP), 2002, by Xiu Xiu